Botho Strauß (born 2 December 1944) is a German playwright, novelist and essayist.

Biography
Botho Strauß's father was a chemist. After finishing his secondary education, Strauß studied German, History of the Theatre and Sociology in Cologne and Munich, but never finished his dissertation on Thomas Mann und das Theater. During his studies, he worked as an extra at the Munich Kammerspiele. From 1967 to 1970, he was a critic and editorial journalist for the journal Theater heute (Theater Today). Between 1970 and 1975, he worked as a dramaturgical assistant to Peter Stein at the West Berlin Schaubühne am Halleschen Ufer. After his first attempt as a writer, a Gorky adaptation for the screen, he decided to live and work as a writer. Strauß had his first breakthrough as a dramatist with the 1977 Trilogie des Wiedersehens, five years after the publication of his first work. In 1984 he published his important work Der Junge Mann (The Young Man, translated by Roslyn Theobald in 1995).

With a 1993 Der Spiegel essay, "Anschwellender Bocksgesang" ("Swelling He-Goat Song"), a critical examination of modern civilisation, he triggered a major political controversy as his conservative politics was anathema to many.

In his theoretical work, Strauß showed the influence of the ancient classics, Nietzsche, Heidegger as well as Adorno, but his outlook was also radically anti-bourgeois.

His work as a writer has been recognized with numerous international awards and his dramas are among the most performed in German-language theatres.

Strauß presently lives in Berlin as well as in the nearby Uckermark region. In 2017, he switched from his long-time publisher Carl Hanser Verlag to Rowohlt Verlag.

Works

Marlenes Schwester, two novellas (1975) 
Schützenehre, novella (1975) 
Trilogie des Wiedersehens, play (1976) 
Die Widmung, novella (1977) 
Groß und klein, scenes (1978) 
Die Hypochonder; Bekannte Gesichter, gemischte Gefühle, two plays (1979) 
Rumor (1980) 
Paare, Passanten 2nd ed. (1981) 
Kalldewey, Farce (1981) 
Der Park, play (1983)  loosely based on Shakespeare's A Midsummer Night's Dream
Tumult translated by Michael Hulse (1984) 
Der junge Mann (1984) 
Diese Erinnerung an einen, der nur einen Tag zu Gast war, poem (1985) 
Die Fremdenführerin, play in two acts (1986)  (pbk.)
Niemand anderes 2nd ed. (1987) 
Versuch, ästhetische und politische Ereignisse zusammenzudenken, texts on theatre 1967–1986 (1987) 
Besucher, three plays (1988) 
Fragmente der Undeutlichkeit (1989) 
Kongress: die Kette der Demütigungen (1989)
Angelas Kleider: Nachtstück in zwei Teilen (1991) 
Schlusschor, three acts (1991) 
Beginnlosigkeit: Reflexionen über Fleck und Linie (1992) 
Das Gleichgewicht play in three acts (1993) 
Wohnen, dämmern, lügen (1994) 
Ithaka, play after the homecoming cantos of the Odyssey (1996) 
Die Fehler des Kopisten (1997) 
Die Ähnlichen: moral Interludes; Der Kuss des Vergessens: Vivarium rot, two plays (1998) 
Jeffers – Akt I und II (1998) 
Der Gebärdensammler, texts on theatre, edited by Thomas Oberender (1999) 
Gedankenfluchten (1999) 
Das Partikular (2000) 
Der Narr und seine Frau heute abend in Pancomedia (2001) 
Unerwartete Rückkehr (2002) 
Die Nacht mit Alice, als Julia ums Haus schlich (2003) 
Der Untenstehende auf Zehenspitzen (2004) 
Die eine und die andere, play in two acts (2005)  (pbk.)
Schändung after Shakespeare's Titus Andronicus (2005)  (pbk.)
Mikado (2006) 
Botho Strauß / Neo Rauch: Der Mittler, Münster 2006, 
 Leichtes Spiel (2009)
 Das blinde Geschehen (2011)
 Die Unbeholfenen. Bewußtseinsnovelle (2007) 
 Vom Aufenthalt (2009) 
 Sie/Er (2012) 
 Die Fabeln von der Begegnung (2013) 
 Lichter des Toren. Der Idiot und seine Zeit (2013) 
 Der zurück in sein Haus gestopfte Jäger (2014) 
 Herkunft (2014) 
 Allein mit allen. Gedankenbuch (2014) 
 Oniritti Höhlenbilder (2016) 
 Der Fortführer (2018)

English translations
Drama Contemporary. Germany: plays by Botho Strauss et al.; edited by Carl Weber. (1996)  (alk. paper)  (pbk., alk. paper)
West Coast Plays 8: Edited by Rick Foster (1981)   Mathuen Drama, 1981.
Big and Little, scenes, translated by Anne Cattaneo (1979) 
Big and Small, translated by Martin Crimp (2011)A Sydney Theatre Company production, co-commissioned by the Barbican Centre, London 2012 Festival, Théâtre de la Ville, Paris, Vienna Festival and Ruhrfestspiele Recklinghausen; Cate Blanchett as Lotte.
Couples, Passersby translated by Roslyn Theobald (1996)  (alk. paper)
Devotion translated by Sophie Wilkins (1995)  (pbk., alk. paper)
Living, Glimmering, Lying translated by Roslyn Theobald (1999)  (alk. paper)
The Park translated by Tinch Minter and Anthony Vivis, Sheffield Academic Press (1988) 
The Young Man translated by Roslyn Theobald (1995)  (alk. paper)
Three Plays (The Park, Seven Doors, Time and the Room) translated by Jeremy Sams, Oberon, 2006

Prizes and awards
1974: Hannoverscher Dramatikerpreis
1977: Förderpreis of the Schiller Memorial Prize
1981: Großer Literaturpreis der Bayerischen Akademie der Schönen Künste
1982: Mülheimer Dramatikerpreis
1987: Jean Paul Prize
1989: Georg Büchner Prize
1993: Berlin Theatre Prize
2001: 
2007: Schiller Memorial Prize

Notes and references
Notes

References

External links

Botho Strauß: New German dramatic art. Goethe-Instituts Website
"Books in Brief: Fiction" on Couples, Passersby by Erik Burns, The New York Times (29 December 1996)

1944 births
20th-century German dramatists and playwrights
20th-century German male writers
20th-century German novelists
20th-century essayists
21st-century German dramatists and playwrights
21st-century German male writers
21st-century German novelists
21st-century essayists
Georg Büchner Prize winners
German essayists
German male dramatists and playwrights
German male novelists
German male short story writers
German short story writers
German-language writers
Living people
People from Naumburg (Saale)
Schiller Memorial Prize winners